Charles Blair Birkett is a Canadian former diplomat. He was Chargé d'Affaires to Uruguay.

External links 
 Foreign Affairs and International Trade Canada Complete List of Posts

Year of birth missing (living people)
Living people
Ambassadors of Canada to Uruguay
Place of birth missing (living people)